Darogha Ubbas Alli (aka Darogha Abbas Ali) was a 19th-century Indian engineer and photographer. Following his retirement as a municipal engineer in Lucknow, Alli began photographing the city and its surroundings in the 1870s. He published fifty of these photographs in an album named The Lucknow Album in 1874. In 1880, he produced another photographic album, titled An Illustrated Historical Album of Rajas and Taaluqdars of Oudh, comprising images of the landed gentry of Oudh.

Notes

References
 Union List of Artist Names, s.v. "Alli, Darogha Ubbas". Accessed 4 December 2006.

External links

 Information about Darogha Ubbas Alli
 The Lucknow Album full text with image

19th-century births
19th-century Indian photographers
19th-century Indian engineers
Year of birth missing
Year of death missing
Scientists from Lucknow
Engineers from Uttar Pradesh
Photographers from Uttar Pradesh